José Castro (May 1907 – 29 September 1965) was a Brazilian sports shooter. He competed in the 50 m rifle, prone event at the 1932 Summer Olympics.

References

1907 births
1965 deaths
Brazilian male sport shooters
Olympic shooters of Brazil
Shooters at the 1932 Summer Olympics
Sportspeople from Rio de Janeiro (city)